Rakulik is a small settlement in the hills south of Hruševje in the Municipality of Postojna in the Inner Carniola region of Slovenia.

The local church, built on a small hill north of the settlement, is dedicated to Saint John of Nepomuk and belongs to the Parish of Hrenovice.

References

External links
Rakulik on Geopedia

Populated places in the Municipality of Postojna